A signing bonus or sign-on bonus is a sum of money paid to a new employee (including a professional sports person) by a company as an incentive to join that company. They are often given as a way of making a compensation package more attractive to the employee (e.g., if the annual salary is lower than they desire). It also lowers the risk to the company as it is a one-time payment; for example, if the employee does not meet expectations, the company has not committed to a higher salary. Signing bonuses are often used in professional sports, and to recruit graduates into their first jobs.

To encourage employees to stay at the organization, there are often clauses in the contract whereby if the employee quits before a specified period, they must return the signing bonus. In sports contracts, the full amount of signing bonuses is not always paid immediately, but spread out over time. In such cases, the main difference between a signing bonus and base salary is that the former is "guaranteed" money meaning the team is obligated to pay the bonus when due even if it cuts the player, unless the player retires or the contract is otherwise terminated due to a significant breach on the part of the player.

As of March 2019, Aaron Rodgers had received the highest signing bonus in National Football League history, at $57.5 million. As of June 2020, Spencer Torkelson had received the largest signing bonus in a draft in Major League Baseball history, at $8.4 million.

See also
Advance payment
Play or pay contract
Golden hello
Roster bonus

References

Employee bonus
Human resource management